Beastars is a manga series that takes place in a world of modern, civilized, anthropomorphic animals with a cultural divide between carnivores and herbivores. The series takes its name from the in-universe rank of Beastar, an individual of great talent, service, and notoriety. The story focuses on the gray wolf Legoshi as he deals with his attraction to the rabbit Haru.  Paru Itagaki launched the manga in Akita Shoten's magazine Weekly Shōnen Champion on September 8, 2016.

In a September 2019 interview with Spanish website Ramen Para Dos, Itagaki stated that the manga would have "at most twenty volumes". In January 2020, Itagaki commented that the "end is in sight". The series finished with its 196th chapter on October 8, 2020. Akita Shoten has compiled its chapters into twenty-two individual tankōbon volumes. The first volume was released on January 6, 2017. The 22nd and final volume was released on January 8, 2021. During their panel at Anime NYC 2018, Viz Media announced that they have licensed the manga. The first volume was released on July 16, 2019.

Volume list

References

External links
 
 at Viz Media

Beastars